Connor Court Publishing is an Australian publishing company based in Brisbane, Queensland. The company, founded in September 2005 by Anthony Cappello, publishes all sorts of commercial books – including many biographies, books on politics and in particular – climate change denial, culture and education.

Founding and history
The name "Connor Court" comes from a concatenation of the American writer Flannery O'Connor and 17th century Dutch economist Pieter de la Court. Connor Court was founded in Ballan, Victoria, before moving to Ballarat and then, in 2016, to Queensland. Before starting Connor Court Cappello worked at Freedom Publishing imprint of the late Santamaria's National Civic Council (NCC).

Connor Court publishes a diverse range of books but has a focus on conservative and religious subjects. Connor Court has published many authors, contributing authors and editors from the Institute of Public Affairs such as Andrew McIntyre, Chris Berg, John Roskam, Cory Bernadi, Tim Wilson, Gary Johns, Mikayla Novak, James Grant, Alan Moran, Bob Day, Simon Breheny and Tom Switzer. John Roskam, executive director of the Institute of Public Affairs, sits on the editorial board of Connor Court. Connor Court has also published books in conjunction with the Institute of Public Affairs, such as Australian Essays by Roger Scruton.

Authors published include Cardinal George Pell, John Killick, Peter Coleman and James Franklin. Its books have been launched by prominent public figures such as Peter Costello, Tony Abbott, Dean Brown, Jack Snelling, Steve Bracks, John Howard and Warren Mundine.

Recent authors include Ken Phillips, Barry Cohen, Ian Plimer, Peta Seaton, Jeff Bennett, Barry Dickins, Kerry Cue as well as Rabbi Shimon Cowen. Titles for 2009 included books on Bioethics, Global Warming, Ecology and Utilitarianism. While in 2011 it began publishing titles on Australian Rules Football.

One of its titles, The Light River, by Hal G.P. Colebatch won the Poetry Category in the 2007 Premier's Award of Western Australia. In 2009 it published Heaven and Earth by Ian Plimer. According to the publisher, the book sold over 40,000 copies and reached number one on the Nielsen BookScan Australia, 2 May 2009.

In 2012 Connor Court authors ranged from Gary Johns to Barry Dickins.

No Contraception, No Dole by Gary Johns was released in September 2015.

In 2015 Connor Court published a biography of the former Queensland Premier Campbell Newman and launched the book at Tattersall's Club, Brisbane. The book caused controversy with a number of publishers turning it down and a number of bookstores not stocking it as a protest to Newman's withdrawal of funding for the Premier's Literary Awards while in government.

Publications
Publications include: 
Mark Lawson, (2010), A Guide to Climate Change Lunacy, 
Ian Plimer. (2009), Heaven and Earth: Global Warming the missing Science, 
Garth Paltridge, (2009), The Climate Caper, 
Robert L. Bradley, (2004), Climate Alarmism Reconsidered, 
Anthony Paganoni, (2007), The Pastoral Care of Italians in Australia 
George Pell, (2007), God and Caesar 
James Franklin, ed, (2007), Life to the Full: Rights and Social Justice in Australia, 
Brian Coman, (2007) A Loose Canon: Essays on History, Modernity and Tradition, 
Peter Coleman, (2006), The Heart of James McAuley (2nd ed), 
James Franklin, (2006), Catholic Values and Australian Realities, 
Joseph N. Santamaria, The Education of Dr Joe, 
John Flader, (2008) Question Time: 150 Questions and Answers on the Catholic Faith, 
Tess Livingstone, (2008) Enid Blyton at Old Thatch, 
Hal Colebatch, (2007) The Light River, 
Mark Lopez, (2008), The Little Black School Book: Volume 1. The Secret to Getting Straight 'As' at School and University, 
George Pell, (2010), Test Everything, 
Desmond O'Grady, (2010), A Word in Edgeways, 
Chris Berg and John Roskam, (2010), 100 Great Books on Liberty, 
John Molony, 2010, By Wendouree, Memories 1951-1963, 
Guy Barnett, 2010, Make a Difference: A Practical Guide to Lobbying,

References

External links
Connor Court Publishing

Book publishing companies of Australia
Small press publishing companies
Publishing companies established in 2005